Daphnusa zythum is a species of moth of the family Sphingidae. It is known from Sumatra.

References

Smerinthini
Moths described in 2009